Kevin Alexander Morrison (born June 1976) is an American cultural historian living in China. His research includes 19th-century political cultures and popular literature, British Empire, East India Company, and transnationalism. Since January 2019, he has been Henan Provincial Chair Professor and university Distinguished Professor of British Literature in the School of Foreign Languages at Henan University, Kaifeng, China. He is a general editor of journal Cultural History, President of the Society for Global Nineteenth-Century Studies, Editor-in-Chief of journal Global Nineteenth-Century Studies, and Co-editor of book series Studies in the Global Nineteenth Century Book Series. Morrison hold elected fellowships in the Royal Society of Arts, the Royal Asiatic Society, and the Royal Historical Society.

Academic career
He received his Ph.D. in English from the Rice University in 2009. Between 2009 and 2018, Morrison taught at the Syracuse University. He was Visiting Fellow at National University of Singapore (2018) and Distinguished Visiting professor at University of Connecticut (2020).

Works

Single-authored monographs 
Study Abroad Pedagogy, Dark Tourism, and Historical Reenactment: In the Footsteps of Jack the Ripper and His Victims (Palgrave Macmillan, 2019)
Victorian Liberalism and Material Culture: Synergies of Thought and Place (Edinburgh University Press, 2018)
A Micro-History of Victorian Liberal Parenting: John Morley's "Discreet Indifference" (Palgrave Macmillan, 2018)

Single-edited books 
The Provincial Fiction of Mitford, Gaskell and Eliot (Edinburgh University Press, 2023)
Victorian Pets and Poetry (Routledge, 2023)
Political and Sartorial Styles: Britain and Its Colonies in the Long Nineteenth Century ( Manchester University Press, 2023)
Victorian Culture and Experiential Learning: Historical Encounters in the Classroom (Palgrave Macmillan, 2022)
Making the Grade: Reimagining the Graduate Seminar Essay in Literary Studies (Rowman & Littlefield, 2021)
Critical Edition of The Silence of Dean Maitland by Maxwell Gray (Cambridge Scholars Publishing, 2019)
Walter Besant: The Business of Literature and the Pleasures of Reform (Liverpool University Press, 2019)
Companion to Victorian Popular Fiction (McFarland, 2018)
Affections and Domesticities: Writings on Victorian Family Life (Cognella Academic Publishing, 2016)

References

Fellows of the Royal Historical Society
21st-century American historians
Fellows of the Royal Asiatic Society
Academic staff of Henan University